Peresecina is a village in Orhei District, Moldova.

Notable people
 Sergiu Niță
 Radu Sîrbu
 Alexandra Remenco

References

Villages of Orhei District
Ulichs